The New York Generals were an American professional soccer team based in New York City that competed in the National Professional Soccer League (NPSL) in 1967 and the North American Soccer League (NASL) in 1968.

Founded as charter members of the NPSL, the team was owned by RKO General and Wall Street investor Peter Elser and played their home games at Yankee Stadium. Following the NPSL's merger with the United Soccer Association to form the NASL in 1968, the Generals became the sole professional soccer team in New York City. The Generals played on season in the NASL before folding after the 1968 season. The New York Cosmos, founded in 1970, would take the Generals place as New York City's professional soccer team and shared both the Generals' colors and home stadium.

History 
From the founding of the National Professional Soccer League (NPSL), New York City was considered was considered a market of immense importance to the league. According to soccer historian David Wagner, New York City's "hugely influential media was likely to make or break the entire venture." The New York Generals were originally founded and owned by RKO General (which at the time also owned WOR-TV) and Wall Street investor Peter Elser. The team's gold and green color scheme was based on that of the Green Bay Packers, which had been one of the more successful gridiron football teams of that time. The contrasting colors were also chosen with consideration towards viewers of black and white television, which was still fairly common in the United States at this time (as one team director said, they were "good colors for television"). The team's name was chosen as a direct reference to their owner, RKO General. Freddie Goodwin was selected as head coach for the team and quickly assembled a team that included players such as Barrie Wright and César Luis Menotti. Pre-season training for the team was held at a high school soccer field in Florida. As part of an agreement with the New York Yankees, the Generals played their home games at Yankee Stadium. The team's held their first home game on April 22, 1967, a 2–1 victory against the Chicago Spurs. The Generals finished their sole season in the NPSL with a win–loss–tie record of 11–13–8.

Following the 1967 season, the NPSL merged with the United Soccer Association (USA) to form the North American Soccer League (NASL). Following the merger, the New York Skyliners of the USA folded, making the New York Generals the sole major soccer team in New York City. While the two teams were initially planned to merge into one team, Peter Elser (who had become the Generals' sole owner following RKO General's withdrawal in January 1968) opted against this plan and continued to recruit partners and players for the Generals. Prior to the 1968 season, Gordon Bradley was hired as a player and assistant coach. Bradley had been brought to the attention of the Generals because of his experience as coach and player on the New York Ukrainians. Co Prins also joined the team following the folding of the Pittsburgh Phantoms, which he had been a member of the previous year. While the Generals improved to a 12–8–12 record, they again failed to qualify for postseason play. A highlight of the 1968 season occurred on July 12, when the Generals hosted Santos FC in an exhibition match at Yankee Stadium. The game, a 5–3 win for the Generals, is notable for featuring Pelé, who would later become a player in the NASL when he joined the New York Cosmos in 1975.

Following the 1968 season, the NASL experienced severe hardships as their television contract with CBS expired and multiple teams folded. Famous tennis star Eugene Scott, who had been a director of the Generals, was appointed temporary chairman of the NASL. However, the following year, Phil Woosnam was appointed NASL commissioner and announced plans for a truncated 1969 season that would feature teams from the United Kingdom playing as stand-ins for their American counterparts. Following this, Scott left and the Generals soon after folded. The Generals became defunct in February 1969. New York City would remain without an NASL franchise until the 1971 season, when the New York Cosmos began play. The Cosmos would share a gold and green color scheme with the Generals and played their home games at the Generals' former home venue, Yankee Stadium. Furthermore, former Generals player Gordon Bradley served as the Cosmos' first head coach.

Year-by-year

Coach
  Freddie Goodwin

References

Bibliography

 
 
 
 
 

Defunct soccer clubs in New York City
National Professional Soccer League (1967) franchises
North American Soccer League (1968–1984) teams
Generals
1967 establishments in New York City
1968 disestablishments in New York (state)
Association football clubs established in 1967
Association football clubs disestablished in 1968
Sports in the Bronx